Arp 299 (parts of it are also known as IC 694 and NGC 3690) is a pair of colliding galaxies approximately 134 million light-years away in the constellation Ursa Major.  Both of the galaxies involved in the collision are barred irregular galaxies.

It is not completely clear which object is historically called IC 694. According to some sources, the small appendage more than an arcminute northwest of the main pair is actually IC 694, not the primary (eastern) companion.

The interaction of the two galaxies in Arp 299 produced young powerful starburst regions similar to those seen in II Zw 96.  Seven supernovae have been detected in Arp 299: SN 1992bu, SN 1993G, SN 1998T, SN 1999D were observed in NGC 3690 while SN 2005U, SN 2010O and SN 2010P were observed in IC 694.

See also 
 Antennae Galaxies
 Mice Galaxies

References

External links 
 
 
 

Interacting galaxies
Barred irregular galaxies
Peculiar galaxies
Luminous infrared galaxies
Ursa Major (constellation)
NGC objects
IC objects
299